

Federal

Constitution of the United States

Statutes

 List of United States federal legislation 
 Acts listed by popular name, via Cornell University
 United States Statutes at Large
 Volumes 1 through 18, 1789–1875, via Library of Congress
 Public Laws (PL)
 Current Congress only, via the U.S. Government Printing Office
 104th Congress through current Congress, via the U.S. Government Printing Office
 United States Code (USC)
 U.S. Code, via Cornell University
 U.S. Code, via the U.S. Government Printing Office
 U.S. Code, via FindLaw.com
 U.S. Code via house.gov
 U.S. Code, via USCodeSurf.com

Administrative regulations

 Code of Federal Regulations (CFR)
 List of United States federal executive orders (EO)

Court precedents

Findlaw Cases and Codes
United States Reports – Supreme Court cases
Lists of United States Supreme Court cases
Federal Reporter – Courts of Appeals and Federal Claims cases
List of notable United States Courts of Appeals cases 
Federal Supplement – District Courts cases
Federal Appendix – "Unpublished" cases

States
State constitutions

Court precedents
List of notable United States state supreme court cases
Findlaw Cases and Codes

Statutes
Findlaw State Government page

Regulations
List of State Administrative Codes and Registers from the National Association of Secretaries of State

Local codes and ordinances
American Legal Publishing's Code Library
E-Codes from the General Code Corporation
Municipal Code Corporation's Online Library

Secondary sources
List of Uniform Acts (United States)
American Jurisprudence
Corpus Juris Secundum
Restatements of the Law
Casebooks
Law reviews

See also
United States law
List of legal abbreviations
Legal research
Legal Research in the United States
For more information on official, unofficial, and authenticated online state laws and regulations, see Matthews & Baish,  State-by-State Authentication of Online Legal Resources, American Association of Law Libraries, 2007.
Law of the United States
Legal research